Shirkey is an Anglicised Irish surname. Notable people with the surname include:

George Shirkey (1936–2022), American football player
Mike Shirkey (born 1954), American politician

Anglicised Irish-language surnames